The 2002-03 season of the Divizia A Feminin was the 13th season of Romania's premier women's football league. Two divisions (West/South) with 4 teams each played a sextuple round robin. First two places in each division qualified to the final tournament (single-leg semifinals and finals).

Championship play-off

Semifinals

Third Place

Final

References

Rom
Fem
Romanian Superliga (women's football) seasons